Elections to East Ayrshire Council were held on 1 May 2003, the same day as the 31 other local government elections in Scotland and elections to the Scottish Parliament. This was the third election since the council's creation in 1995 and the last election to use first-past-the-post voting.

Labour maintained control of the council after increasing their vote share to 49.2%. The party won a majority of the seats and increased their representation on the council. The Scottish National Party (SNP) remained as the largest opposition party on the council despite a net loss of six seats and the Conservatives held their only seat on the council.

Following the introduction of the Local Governance (Scotland) Act 2004, local elections in Scotland would use the single transferable vote electoral system which meant this was the last election in which the 32 single-member wards created by the Third Statutory Reviews of Electoral Arrangements would be contested.

Summary

Source:

Ward results

Stewarton East and Dunlop

Stewarton Central

Kilmaurs and Stewarton South

North Kilmarnock, Fenwick and Waterside

Crosshouse, Gatehead and Knockentiber

Altonhill, Hillhead and Longpark

Onthank

Kilmarnock Central West

Kilmarnock Central East

North New Farm Loch and Dean

South New Farm Loch

Crookedholm, Moscow, Galston West and Hurlford North

Newmilns

Grange and Howard

Kilmarnock Central South

Riccarton

Shortlees

Bellfield

Hurlford

Galston East

Darvel

Mauchline

Catrine, Sorn and Mauchline East

Muirkirk, Lugar and Logan

Drongan, Stair and Rankinston

Ochiltree, Skares, Netherthird and Craigens

Auchinleck

Cumnock West

Cumnock East

Patna and Dalrymple

Dalmellington

New Cumnock

By-elections (2003–07)

References

2003 Scottish local elections
2003